In Euclidean geometry, Ceva's theorem is a theorem about triangles. Given a triangle , let the lines  be drawn from the vertices to a common point  (not on one of the sides of ), to meet opposite sides at  respectively. (The segments  are known as cevians.) Then, using signed lengths of segments,

Ceva's theorem is a theorem of affine geometry, in the sense that it may be stated and proved without using the concepts of angles, areas, and lengths (except for the ratio of the lengths of two line segments that are collinear). It is therefore true for triangles in any affine plane over any field.

A slightly adapted converse is also true: If points  are chosen on  respectively so that 
 
then  are concurrent, or all three parallel. The converse is often included as part of the theorem.

The theorem is often attributed to Giovanni Ceva, who published it in his 1678 work De lineis rectis. But it was proven much earlier by Yusuf Al-Mu'taman ibn Hűd, an eleventh-century king of Zaragoza.

Associated with the figures are several terms derived from Ceva's name: cevian (the lines  are the cevians of ), cevian triangle (the triangle  is the cevian triangle of ); cevian nest, anticevian triangle, Ceva conjugate.  (Ceva is pronounced Chay'va; cevian is pronounced chev'ian.)

The theorem is very similar to Menelaus' theorem in that their equations differ only in sign. By re-writing each in terms of cross-ratios, the two theorems may be seen as projective duals.

Proofs

Several proofs of the theorem have been given. 
Two proofs are given in the following. 

The first one is very elementary, using only basic properties of triangle areas. However, several cases have to be considered, depending on the position of the point . 

The second proof uses barycentric coordinates and vectors, but is somehow more natural and not case dependent. Moreover, it works in any affine plane over any field.

Using triangle areas

First, the sign of the left-hand side is positive since either all three of the ratios are positive, the case where  is inside the triangle (upper diagram), or one is positive and the other two are negative, the case  is outside the triangle (lower diagram shows one case).

To check the magnitude, note that the area of a triangle of a given height is proportional to its base. So 
 
Therefore,

Similarly,
 
and
 
Multiplying these three equations gives
 
as required.

The theorem can also be proven easily using Menelaus' theorem. From the transversal  of triangle ,
 
and from the transversal  of triangle ,
 
The theorem follows by dividing these two equations.

The converse follows as a corollary. Let  be given on the lines  so that the equation holds. Comparing the two, 
 
But at most one point can cut a segment in a given ratio so .

Using barycentric coordinates

 
and

for every point  (for the definition of this arrow notation and further details, see Affine space).

For Ceva's theorem, the point  is supposed to not belong to any line passing through two vertices of the triangle. This implies that 

 
The left-hand side of this equation is a vector that has the same direction as the line , and the right-hand side has the same direction as the line . These lines have different directions since  are not collinear. It follows that the two members of the equation equal the zero vector, and 

It follows that 

The same reasoning shows

Ceva's theorem results immediately by taking the product of the three last equations.

Generalizations
The theorem can be generalized to higher-dimensional simplexes using barycentric coordinates. Define a cevian of an -simplex as a ray from each vertex to a point on the opposite-face (facet).  Then the cevians are concurrent if and only if a mass distribution can be assigned to the vertices such that each cevian intersects the opposite facet at its center of mass. Moreover, the intersection point of the cevians is the center of mass of the simplex.

Another generalization to higher-dimensional simplexes extends the conclusion of Ceva's theorem that the product of certain ratios is 1. Starting from a point in a simplex, a point is defined inductively on each -face. This point is the foot of a cevian that goes from the vertex opposite the -face, in a -face that contains it, through the point already defined on this-face.  Each of these points divides the face on which it lies into lobes. Given a cycle of pairs of lobes, the product of the ratios of the volumes of the lobes in each pair is 1.   

Routh's theorem gives the area of the triangle formed by three cevians in the case that they are not concurrent.  Ceva's theorem can be obtained from it by setting the area equal to zero and solving.

The analogue of the theorem for general polygons in the plane has been known since the early nineteenth century.
The theorem has also been generalized to triangles on other surfaces of constant curvature.

The theorem also has a well-known generalization to spherical and hyperbolic geometry, replacing the lengths in the ratios with their sines and hyperbolic sines, respectively.

See also
Projective geometry
Median (geometry) – an application
Circumcevian triangle

References

Further reading

External links
 Menelaus and Ceva at MathPages
 Derivations and applications of Ceva's Theorem at cut-the-knot
 Trigonometric Form of Ceva's Theorem at cut-the-knot
 Glossary of Encyclopedia of Triangle Centers includes definitions of cevian triangle, cevian nest, anticevian triangle, Ceva conjugate, and cevapoint
 Conics Associated with a Cevian Nest, by Clark Kimberling
 Ceva's Theorem by Jay Warendorff, Wolfram Demonstrations Project.
 
 Experimentally finding the centroid of a triangle with different weights at the vertices: a practical application of Ceva's theorem at Dynamic Geometry Sketches, an interactive dynamic geometry sketch using the gravity simulator of Cinderella.
 

Affine geometry
Theorems about triangles
Articles containing proofs
Euclidean plane geometry